Akademikerne – The Danish Confederation of Professional Associations Danish: Akademikerne was founded in 1972 and a national trade union center for 25 Danish trade unions.

Akademikerne has a membership of 313,000 and cooperates with the other Danish trade union centre, the Danish Trade Union Confederation (FH).

Members of the 25 trade unions of Akademikerne are typically employees with a higher education, i.e. a master's degree or a postgraduate education. Members of Akademikerne are e.g. lawyers, librarians, psychologists, dentists, veterinarians, pharmacists, high school teachers, medical doctors etc.

Akademikerne is affiliated with the International Trade Union Confederation (ITUC), the European Trade Union Confederation (ETUC), the Trade Union Advisory Committee to the OECD (TUAC) and the Council of Nordic Trade Unions (NFS).

Members
 Danish Union of Architects
 sh Union of Librarians
 Dansk Kiroprator Forening
 Dansk Magisterforening
 Dansk Mejeriingeniør Forening
 Dansk Musikpædagogisk Forening
 Dansk Organist og Kantor Samfund
 Dansk Psykolog Forening
 De Offentlige Tandlæger
 De Offentlige Tandlæger
 Den Danske Dyrlægeforening
 Den danske Præsteforening
 Forbundet Kommunikation og Sprog
 Foreningen af Akademisk Uddannede DJ-medlemmer
 Foreningen af Kliniske Diætister
 Foreningen af Skibsinspektører i Søfartsstyrelsen
 Foreningen af Speciallæger
 Forsvarsgruppen i AC
 Gymnasieskolernes Lærerforening
 Handelsskolernes Lærerforening, Adjunkt/lektorgruppen
 Danish Society of Engineers
 JA
 Danish Medical Association
 Pharmadanmark
 Praktiserende Lægers Organisation
 Tandlægeforeningen
 Yngre Læger

See also

FTF – Confederation of Professionals in Denmark
LO, The Danish Confederation of Trade Unions

External links
Akademikernes Official Website (in Danish)

International Trade Union Confederation
European Trade Union Confederation
Trade Union Advisory Committee to the OECD
Council of Nordic Trade Unions
Trade unions established in 1972